Florence Quivar (born March 3, 1944 in Philadelphia, Pennsylvania) is an American operatic mezzo-soprano who is considered to be "one of the most prominent singers of her generation." She has variously been described as having a "rich, earthy sound and communicative presence" as "always reliable" and as "a distinguished singer, with a warm, rich voice and a dignified performing presence." From 1977-1997 she was a regular performer at the Metropolitan Opera where she gave more than 100 performances.

Early life and education
Quivar first became interested in music as a child. Her mother was a piano and voice teacher who also formed the gospel group the "Harmonic Choraliers". Quivar studied piano and voice with her mother as a child and began singing solos at church by age six. As a teenager she became interested in opera when she saw the Metropolitan Opera's touring production of Madama Butterfly to Philadelphia. Although she wanted to pursue a performing career, Quivar initially decided to pursue a career as an elementary school teacher and enrolled in a teachers' college. After just one day of classes, she realized that her true love was really music, and soon enrolled in the Philadelphia Academy of Music. After graduating, she entered the Juilliard School in 1975. Although she did not stay at the school very long, she did appear as Ježibaba and the Foreign Princess in Dvořák's Rusalka at the Juilliard Opera Center. She later studied privately with Marinka Gurewich in New York City.

Quivar returned to Philadelphia to study in master classes with Maureen Forrester where she began to focus in on lieder and oratorio repertoire. She made her professional recital debut in Philadelphia in 1976 as part of the Franklin Concert Series. That same year, she won the Baltimore Lyric Opera Competition and then returned to New York where she won the Marian Anderson Award. These competition wins drew the attention of noted impresario Harold Shaw and quickly led to engagements at the Metropolitan Opera and orchestras throughout the United States.

Career
In 1976, Quivar portrayed Serena in the Cleveland Orchestra's production of Gershwin's Porgy and Bess. The concert was recorded and went on to win a Grammy Award for best opera recording. The following year Quivar made her debut at the Tanglewood Festival singing in the world premiere of Roger Sessions When Lilacs Last In The Dooryard Bloom'd with the Boston Symphony Orchestra. She also made her Metropolitan Opera début on October 10, 1977 as Marina in Boris Godunov.  She became a regular at the Met during the 1980s and 1990s, appearing as Jocasta in Oedipus rex, Suzuki in Madama Butterfly, Isabella in L'italiana in Algeri, Federica in Luisa Miller, Fidès in Le prophète, Frugola in Il tabarro, Mother Marie in Dialogues des Carmélites, Louis XV Chair in L'enfant et les sortilèges, the Princess in Suor Angelica, Ulrica in Un ballo in maschera, and Serena in Porgy and Bess. Her 101st and last performance at the Met was in a concert performance of Verdi's Requiem in 1997 where she sang the mezzo-soprano solos under the baton of James Levine.

Quivar's other opera credits include performances at the Deutsche Oper Berlin, Bavarian State Opera, La Scala, Teatro la Fenice, Teatro dell'Opera di Roma, the Theatro Municipal in Rio de Janeiro, Teatro Colón, Royal Opera at Covent Garden, Houston Grand Opera, Seattle Opera, and Los Angeles Opera among others. Her other roles includes Adalgisa in Norma, the title role in Carmen, Erda in Siegfried and Das Rheingold, Brangäne in Tristan und Isolde and Orpheus in Gluck's Orfeo ed Euridice, the latter being a role with which she became particularly associated.

She has also performed with many of the world's premiere orchestras, including the New York Philharmonic, Los Angeles Philharmonic, Cincinnati Symphony, Chicago Symphony Orchestra, Philadelphia Orchestra, Cleveland Orchestra, San Francisco Symphony, Toronto Symphony, Orchestre de Paris, Berlin Philharmonic, London Philharmonic, Montreal Symphony and the BBC Symphony Orchestra to name just a few.

Quivar has taken on the task of rescuing the works of forgotten composers, concentrating on those of African-American composers of the 19th and 20th centuries. Her stated goal is "to compile a program of these neglected composers and someday record them." She has also performed in productions of African-American composers' works, as well as a 1981 revival of Virgil Thomson's Four Saints.

She has also been a champion of new music. In 1999 she performed the role of The Goddess of the Waters in the world premiere of Anthony Davis' opera Amistad at the Lyric Opera of Chicago. She also premiered William Bolcom's song cycle From the Diary of Sally Hemings at the Library of Congress in 2001. She has since performed the cycle in recitals throughout the United States in a tour with Harolyn Blackwell in 2002-2003.

Quivar remained active in opera performances until the mid-2000s, when she retired from the operatic stage. She remains active as a concert and recital performer.

Watch and listen
To hear Quivar sing Ulrica in Verdi's Un ballo in maschera

Discography

Choral and symphonic
{| class="wikitable" style="font-size:95%;" 
!Year
!Title
!Genre
!Collaborators
!Label
|-
|1977
|Roger Sessions: When Lilacs Last In The Dooryard Bloom'd
|classical
|Seiji OzawaTanglewood Festival ChorusBoston Symphony OrchestraEsther Hinds (soprano)Dominic Cossa (baritone)
|New World Records
|-
|
|Rossini: Stabat Mater
|classical
|Thomas Schippers (conductor)Cincinnati Symphony OrchestraSung-Sook Lee (soprano)Kenneth Riegel (tenor)Paul Plishka (bass)
|Vox Classic 
|-
|1981
|Mahler: Symphony no. 8 in E flat
|classical
|Seiji OzawaBoston Symphony OrchestraBoston Boy ChoirTanglewood Festival ChorusJudith Blegen (soprano)Faye Robinson (soprano)Deborah Sasson (soprano)Lorna Myers (mezzo-soprano)Kenneth Riegel (tenor)Benjamin Luxon (baritone)Gwynne Howell (bass)
|Philips
|-
|1985
|Mendelssohn: Musik zu Ein Sommernachtstraum, op. 21 & op. 61 Ausschnitte
|classical
|James Levine (conductor)Chicago Symphony Orchestra and ChorusJudith Blegen (soprano)
|Deutsche Grammophon
|-
|1986
|Berlioz: Roméo et Juliette
|classical
|Charles Dutoit (conductor)Tudor Singers of MontrealOrchestre symphonique de MontréalAlberto Cupido (tenor)Tom Krause (baritone)
|London
|-
|1987
|Handel: Messiah|oratorio
|Andrew Davis (conductor)Toronto SymphonyToronto Mendelssohn ChoirKathleen Battle (soprano)Samuel Ramey (bass),John Aler (tenor)
|EMI Classics 
|-
|
|Falla: El sombrero de tres picos (Three Cornered Hat) 
|classical
|Jesús López-Cobos (conductor)Cincinnati Symphony Orchestra
|Telarc
|-
|1989
|Verdi: Requiem|classical
|Carlo Maria Giulini (conductor)Berlin PhilharmonicSimon Estes (bass-baritone)Sharon Sweet (soprano)Vinson Cole (tenor)
|Deutsche Grammophon
|-
|
|Beethoven: Missa solemnis|classical
|Helmuth Rilling (conductor)Bach-Collegium StuttgartPamela Coburn (soprano)Aldo Baldin (tenor)Andreas Schmidt (baritone)
|Hänssler Classic
|-
|
|Messa Per Rossini|classical
|Helmuth Rilling (conductor)Prague Philharmonic OrchestraStuttgart Radio Symphony OrchestraGabriela Beňačková (soprano)Alexandru Agache (baritone)Aage Haugland (bass)James Wagner (Tenor)
|Hänssler Classic
|-
|1992
|Schoenberg: Gurre-Lieder|oratorio
|Zubin Mehta (conductor)New York Choral ArtistsNew York PhilharmonicEva Marton (soprano)Gary Lakes (tenor)Jon Garrison (tenor)John Cheek (bass-baritone)Hans Hotter (bass-baritone)
|-
|1993
|Mahler: Symphony No. 3|classical
|Zubin Mehta (conductor)Israel Philharmonic Orchestra
|Sony Classical
|-
|1994
|Szymanowski: Stabat Mater Litany to the Virgin Mary ; Symphony no. 3|classical
|Sir Simon Rattle (conductor)City of Birmingham Symphony Orchestra and ChorusIwona Sobotka (soprano)John Connell (bass)Elżbieta Szmytka (soprano)
|EMI Classics
|-
|
|Mahler: Symphony no. 2; Symphony No. 5|classical
|Zubin Mehta (conductor)Prague Philharmonic OrchestraNancy Gustafson (soprano)
|Teldec
|-
|
|Beethoven: Symphony No. 9|classical
|André Previn (conductor)Ambrosian SingersRoyal Philharmonic OrchestraRoberta Alexander (soprano)Gary Lakes (tenor)Paul Plishka (baritone)
|RCA Victor
|-
|1995
|Mendelssohn: Elijah|oratorio
|Robert Shaw (conductor)Atlanta Symphony Orchestra & ChorusBarbara Bonney (soprano)Jerry Hadley (tenor)Thomas Hampson (baritone)
|Telarc
|-
|}

Opera recordings

Solo recordings

References

Sources
Elizabeth Forbes: "Florence Quivar", Grove Music Online'' ed. L. Macy (Accessed September 21, 2008), (subscription access)

See also
CAMI page
Interview with Florence Quivar, August 24, 1992

1944 births
Living people
American operatic mezzo-sopranos
Musicians from Philadelphia
20th-century African-American women singers
20th-century American women opera singers
African-American women opera singers
University of the Arts (Philadelphia) alumni
Singers from Pennsylvania
Classical musicians from Pennsylvania
21st-century African-American women singers
21st-century American women opera singers